Synagris maxillosa is a species of potter wasp in the subfamily Eumeninae of the family Vespidae.

References

Potter wasps
Insects described in 1863